Perideridia oregana is a species of flowering plant in the family Apiaceae known by the common names Oregon yampah and eppaw. It is native to Oregon and California in the western United States, where it grows in woodland and other habitat. This plant is quite variable in appearance. In general, it is a perennial herb 10 to 90 centimeters tall, its green to waxy-grayish erect stem growing from a cluster of small tubers. Leaves near the base of the plant have blades 3 to 30 centimeters long divided into a variable number of leaflets, which may be subdivided into smaller segments. The inflorescence is a compound umbel of many spherical clusters of small white flowers. These yield ribbed, oblong-shaped fruits 3 to 6 millimeters long.

References

External links
 
 
The Jepson eFlora 2013
USDA PLANTS
CalPhotos

oregana
Flora of California
Flora of Oregon